The sybyzgy (sybyzǵy) is a Kyrgyz sideblown flute traditionally played by shepherds and horse herders, made from apricot wood or the wood of mountain bushes. Length 600–650 mm. The sybyzgy sound scale is estimated from 4 to 6 holes.

On the territory of Kyrgyzstan, there are two types of sybyzgy associated with different performing traditions. The eastern sybyzgy has a conical shape, shorter and smaller in diameter, and the western variety is larger and longer.

The sybyzgy is an important instrument to the Kyrgyz people.

note 

Kazakhstani musical instruments
Side-blown flutes